The history of the Jews in Ukraine dates back over a thousand years; Jewish communities have existed in the modern territory of Ukraine from the time of the Kievan Rus' (late 9th to mid-13th century). Important Jewish religious and cultural movements, from Hasidism to Zionism, arose there. According to the World Jewish Congress, the Jewish community in Ukraine constitutes Europe's third-largest and the world's fifth-largest.

At times it flourished, while at other times it faced persecution and anti-Semitic discrimination. In the Ukrainian People's Republic (1917-1920), Yiddish became a state language, along with Ukrainian and Russian. At that time, the Jewish National Union was created and the community was granted autonomous status. Yiddish was used on Ukrainian currency between 1917 and 1920. Before World War II, slightly less than one-third of Ukraine's urban population consisted of Jews. Ukrainian Jews included sub-groups with distinct characteristics, including Ashkenazi Jews, Mountain Jews, Bukharan Jews, Crimean Karaites, Krymchak Jews, and Georgian Jews.

In the westernmost region, Jews were mentioned for the first time in records in 1030. During the Khmelnytsky Uprising between 1648 and 1657, an army of Cossacks massacred and took large numbers of Jews, Roman Catholics, and Uniate Christians into captivity. One estimate (1996) reported that 15,000-30,000 Jews were killed or taken captive, and that 300 Jewish communities were completely destroyed. More recent estimates (2014) report mortality of 3,000-6,000 people between the years 1648–1649.

During 1821 anti-Jewish riots in Odesa followed the death of the Greek Orthodox Patriarch in Constantinople, in which 14 Jews were recorded killed. Some sources claim this episode as the first pogrom. At the start of the 20th century, anti-Jewish pogroms continued, leading to large-scale emigration. In 1915, the imperial Russian government expelled thousands of Jews from the Empire's border areas.

During the Russian Revolution and ensuing Civil War, an estimated 31,071 Jews were killed in pogroms between 1918 and 1920. During the Ukrainian People's Republic (1917–21), pogroms continued. In Ukraine, the number of civilian Jews killed by the Ukrainian Army under Symon Petliura during the period was estimated at between 35,000 to 100,000 

Pogroms erupted in January 1919 in the northwest province of Volhynia and spread to many other regions and continued until 1921. The actions of the Soviet government by 1927 led to a growing antisemitism.

Total civilian losses in Ukraine during World War II and the German occupation are estimated at seven million. More than one million Soviet Jews, including 225,000 in Belarus, were killed by the Einsatzgruppen and their many Ukrainian supporters. Most of them were killed in Ukraine because most pre-WWII Soviet Jews lived in the Pale of Settlement, of which Ukraine was the biggest part. The major massacres against Jews occurred mainly in the first phase of the occupation, although they continued until the return of the Red Army. In 1959 Ukraine had 840,000 Jews, a decrease of almost 70% from 1941 totals (within Ukraine's current borders). Ukraine's Jewish population continued to decline significantly during the Cold War. In 1989, Ukraine's Jewish population was only slightly more than half of what it was in 1959. During and after the collapse of communism in the 1990s, the majority of Jews in 1989 left the country and moved abroad (mostly to Israel). Antisemitism, including violent attacks on Jews, is still a problem in Ukraine.

Kievan Rus'

By the 11th century, Byzantine Jews of Constantinople had familial, cultural, and theological ties with the Jews of Kyiv. For instance, some 11th-century Jews from Kievan Rus participated in an anti-Karaite assembly held in either Thessaloniki or Constantinople. One of the three Kyivan city gates in the times of Yaroslav the Wise was called Zhydovski (Judaic).

Galicia-Volhynia

In Galicia, Jews were mentioned for the first time in 1030. From the second part of the 14th century, they were subjects of Polish kings and magnates. The Jewish population of Galicia and Bukovina, part of Austria-Hungary, made up 5% of the global Jewish population.

Polish–Lithuanian Commonwealth

From the founding of the Kingdom of Poland in the 10th century through the creation of the Polish–Lithuanian Commonwealth in 1569, Poland was one of the most diverse countries in Europe. It became home to one of the world's largest and most vibrant Jewish communities. The Jewish community in the territory of Ukraine-proper during the Commonwealth became one of the largest and most important ethnic minority groups in Ukraine.

Cossack Uprising and the Deluge

Ukrainian Cossack Hetman Bohdan Khmelnytsky led a Cossack uprising, known as Khmelnytsky Uprising (1648–1657), under the premise that the Poles had sold them as slaves "into the hands of the accursed Jews." It is estimated that at that time the Jewish population in Ukraine numbered 51,325. An army of Cossacks massacred and took into captivity numerous Jews, Roman Catholics and Uniates in 1648–49.

A 1996 estimate reports that 15,000-30,000 Jews were killed or taken captive, and that 300 Jewish communities were destroyed. A 2014 estimate reduce the toll to 3,000-6,000 from 1648–1649; of these, 3,000-6,000 Jews were killed by Cossacks in Nemirov in May 1648 and 1,500 in Tulczyn in July 1648.

Rise of Hasidism and internal struggles

The Cossack Uprising and the Deluge left a deep and lasting impression on Jewish social and spiritual life.

This was a time of mysticism and overly formal rabbinism. The teachings of Israel ben Eliezer, known as the Baal Shem Tov, or BeShT, (1698–1760) had a profound effect on Eastern European Jews. His disciples taught and encouraged a new and fervent brand of Judaism, related to Kabbalah, known as Hasidism. The rise of Hasidism influenced Haredi Judaism, with a continuous influence through many Hasidic dynasties.

A different movement was started by Jacob Frank in the middle of the 18th century. Frank's teachings were unorthodox (such as purification through transgression and adoption of elements of Christianity). He was excommunicated along with his numerous followers. They eventually converted to Catholicism.

Russian Empire and Austrian rule

The traditional measures used to keep the Russian Empire free of Jews were hindered when the main territory of Polish-Lithuanian Commonwealth was annexed during the partitions of Poland. During the second (1793) and the third (1795) partitions, large populations of Jews were absorbed by the Russian Empire, and Catherine the Great established the Pale of Settlement that included Congress Poland and Crimea.

During 1821 anti-Jewish riots in Odessa after the death of the Greek Orthodox patriarch in Constantinople, 14 Jews were killed. Some sources mark this episode as the first pogrom, while according to others (such as the Jewish Encyclopedia, 1911 ed.) say the first pogrom was an 1859 riot in Odessa. The term became common after a wave of anti-Jewish violence swept the southern Russian Empire (including Ukraine) between 1881 and 1884, after Jews were blamed for the assassination of Alexander II.

In May 1882, Alexander III of Russia introduced temporary regulations called May Laws that remained in effect until 1917. Systematic policies of discrimination, strict quotas on the number of Jews allowed to obtain education and professions caused widespread poverty and mass emigration. In 1886, an edict of Expulsion was applied to Jews in Kyiv. In 1893–1894, some areas of Crimea were removed from the Pale.

When Alexander III died in Crimea on 20 October 1894, according to Simon Dubnow: "as the body of the deceased was carried by railway to St. Petersburg, the same rails were carrying the Jewish exiles from Yalta to the Pale. The reign of Alexander III began with pogroms and concluded with expulsions."

Odessa became the home of a large Jewish community during the 19th century, and by 1897 Jews were estimated to account for some 37% of the population.

Political activism and emigration

Jews were over-represented in the Russian revolutionary leadership. However, most were hostile to Jewish culture and Jewish political parties, and were loyal to the Communist Party's atheism and proletarian internationalism, and committed to stamping out any sign of "Jewish cultural particularism".

Counter-revolutionary groups, including the Black Hundreds, opposed the Revolution with violent attacks on socialists and pogroms against Jews. A backlash came from the conservative elements of society, notably in spasmodic anti-Jewish attacks – around five hundred were killed in a single day in Odessa. Nicholas II claimed that 90% of revolutionaries were Jews.

Early 20th century

At the start of 20th century, anti-Jewish pogroms continued to occur in cities and towns across the Russian Empire such as Kishinev, Kyiv, Odessa, and many others. Numerous Jewish self-defense groups were organized to prevent the outbreak of pogroms among which the most successful one was under the leadership of Mishka Yaponchik in Odessa.

In 1905, a series of pogroms erupted at the same time as the Revolution against the government of Nicholas II. The chief organizers of the pogroms were the members of the Union of the Russian People (commonly known as the "Black Hundreds").

From 1911 to 1913, the antisemitic tenor of the period was characterized by a number of blood libel cases (accusations of Jews murdering Christians for ritual purposes). One of the most famous was the two-year trial of Menahem Mendel Beilis, who was charged with the murder of a Christian boy. The trial was showcased by the authorities to illustrate the perfidy of the Jewish population.

From March to May 1915, in the face of the German army, the government expelled thousands of Jews from the Empire's border areas, mainly the Pale of Settlement.

World War I aftermath

During the 1917 Russian Revolution and the ensuing Russian Civil War, an estimated 70,000 to 250,000 Jewish civilians were killed in atrocities throughout the former Russian Empire. In  modern Ukraine an estimated 31,071 died in 1918–1920.

Ukrainian People's Republic

During the establishment of the Ukrainian People's Republic (UPR, 1917–1921), pogroms continued. In the UPR, Yiddish was an official language, while all government posts and institutions had Jewish members. A Ministry for Jewish Affairs was established (it was the first modern state to do so). Rights of Jewish culture were guaranteed. Jewish parties abstained or voted against the Tsentralna Rada's Fourth Universal of 25 January 1918 which was aimed at breaking ties with Bolshevik Russia and proclaiming a sovereign Ukrainian state,  since all Jewish parties were strongly against Ukrainian independence.

In Ukraine alone, the number of civilian Jews killed during the period was estimated to be between 35,000 and 50,000. Archives declassified after 1991 provide evidence of a higher number; in the period from 1918 to 1921, "according to incomplete data, at least 100,000 Jews were killed in Ukraine in the pogroms." The Ukrainian People's Republic did issue orders condemning pogroms and attempted to investigate them. But it lacked authority to stop violence. In the last months of its existence it lacked any power to create social stability.

Among the prominent Ukrainian statesmen of this period were Moisei Rafes, Pinkhas Krasny, Abram Revutsky, Moishe Zilberfarb, and many others. (see General Secretariat of Ukraine) The autonomy of Ukraine was openly greeted by the Ukrainian Jewish Volodymyr Zhabotinsky.

Between April and December 1918 the Ukrainian People's Republic was non-existent and overthrown by the Ukrainian State of Pavlo Skoropadsky who ended the experiment in Jewish autonomy.

Provisional Government of Russia and Soviets
The February 1917 revolution brought a liberal Provisional Government to power in the Russian Empire. On 21 March/3 April, the government removed all "discrimination based upon ethnic religious or social grounds". The Pale was officially abolished. The removal of the restrictions on Jews' geographical mobility and educational opportunities led to a migration to the country's major cities.

One week after the 25 October / 7 November 1917 Bolshevik Revolution, the new government proclaimed the "Declaration of the Rights of the Peoples [Nations] of Russia," promising all nationalities the rights of equality, self-determination and secession. Jews were not specifically mentioned in the declaration, reflecting Lenin's view that Jews did not constitute a nation.

In 1918, the RSFSR Council of Ministers issued a decree entitled "On the Separation of Church from State and School from Church", depriving religious communities of the status of juridical persons, the right to own property and the right to enter into contracts. The decree nationalized the property of religious communities and banned their assessment of religious tuition. As a result, religion could be taught or studied only in private.

On 1 February 1918 the Commissariat for Jewish National Affairs was established as a subsection of the Commissariat for Nationality Affairs. It was mandated to establish the "dictatorship of the proletariat in the Jewish streets" and attract the Jewish masses to the regime while advising local and central institutions on Jewish issues. The Commissariat was also expected to fight the influence of Zionist and Jewish-Socialist Parties. On 27 July 1918 the Council of People's Commissars issued a decree stating that antisemitism is "fatal to the cause of the ... revolution". Pogroms were officially outlawed. On 20 October 1918 the Jewish section of the CPSU (Yevsektsia) was established for the Party's Jewish members; its goals were similar to those of the Jewish Commissariat.

The White Army and counterrevolutionary pogroms
In contrast with the Bolshevik government's official policy of equality among citizens, antisemitism remained deeply entrenched in the political and social ideologies of the tsarist counterrevolutionaries, especially among paramilitary groups such as the Black Hundreds. These militias incited and organized pogroms against Russian Jews. The official slogan of the Black Hundreds was "Bei Zhidov," meaning 'Beat the Jews.' Thus, during the Russian Civil War that followed the 1917 Revolution, the Jews became a crucial site of the conflict between revolutionary Reds and counterrevolutionary Whites, particularly in the contested territory of Ukraine. The Bolsheviks' official opposition to antisemitism—coupled with the prominence of Jews such as Leon Trotsky within the Bolshevik ranks—allowed the Christian nationalist movements of both the White Army and the emergent Ukrainian National Republic to link Ukrainian Jews to the despised communism. These connections, combined with the cultural tradition of antisemitism among Russian peasantry, provided ample justification for the Whites to attack Ukraine's Jewish population. Between 1918 and 1921, almost all of the approximately 2,000 pogroms carried out in Ukraine were organized by White Army forces. eyewitnesses reported hearing counterrevolutionary milita members expound slogans such as, "We beat the Yids, we beat the Commune", and "This is the answer to the Bolsheviks for the Red Terror." Recent studies hold that about 30,000 Jews were killed in these pogroms, while another 150,000 died from wounds sustained during the violence.

Pogroms in western Ukraine

The pogroms that erupted in January 1919 in the northwest province of Volhynia spread during February and March to the cities, towns, and villages of many other regions of Ukraine. After Sarny it was the turn of Ovruch, northwest of Kyiv. In Tetiev on 25 March, approximately 4,000 Jews were murdered, half in a synagogue set ablaze by Cossack troops under Colonels Kurovsky, Cherkowsy, and Shliatoshenko. Then Vashilkov (6 and 7 April). In Dubovo (17 June) 800 Jews were decapitated in assembly-line fashion. According to David A. Chapin, the town of Proskurov (now Khmelnitsky), near the city of Sudilkov, "was the site of the worst atrocity committed against Jews this century before the Nazis." Pogroms continued until 1921.

Pogroms across Podolia

On 15 February 1919, during the Ukrainian-Soviet war, Otaman Ivan Semesenko initiated a pogrom Proskurov in which many Jews were massacred on Shabbat (parashah Tesaveh). Semesenko claimed that the pogrom was in retaliation for a previous Bolshevik uprising that he believed was led by Jews.

According to the pinqasim record books those murdered in the pogrom included 390 men, 309 women and 76 children. The number of wounded exceeded 500. Two weeks later Order 131 was published in the central newspaper by the head of Directorate of Ukraine. In it Symon Petliura denounced such actions and eventually executed Otaman Semesenko by firing-squad in November 1919. Semesenko's brigade was disarmed and dissolved. This event is especially remarkable because it was used to justify Sholem Schwarzbard's assassination of the Ukrainian leader in 1926. Although Petliura's direct involvement was never proven, Schwartzbard was acquitted in revenge. The series of Jewish pogroms around Ukraine culminated in the Kyiv pogroms of 1919 between June and October of that year.

Bolsheviks/USSR consolidation of power
In July 1919, the Central Jewish Commissariat dissolved the kehillot (Jewish Communal Councils). The kehillot had provided social services to the Jewish community.

From 1919 to 1920, Jewish parties and Zionist organizations were driven underground as the Communist government sought to abolish all potential opposition. The Yevsektsiya Jewish section of the Soviet Communist party was at the forefront of the anti-religious campaigns of the 1920s that led to the closing of religious institutions, the break-up of religious communities and the further restriction of access to religious education. To that end a series of "community trials" against the Jewish religion were held. The last known such trial, on the subject of circumcision, was held in 1928 in Kharkiv. At the same time, the body worked to establish a secular identity for the Jewish community.

In 1921 many Jews emigrated to Poland, as they were entitled by a peace treaty in Riga to choose the country they preferred. Several hundred thousand joined the already numerous Jewish minority of the Polish Second Republic.

On 31 January 1924 the Commissariat for Nationalities' Affairs was disbanded. On 29 August 1924 an official agency for Jewish resettlement, the Commission for the Settlement of Jewish Toilers on the Land (KOMZET), was established. KOMZET studied, managed and funded projects for Jewish resettlement in rural areas. A public organization, the Society for the Agricultural Organization of Working Class Jews in the USSR (OZET), was created in January 1925 to help recruit colonists and support the colonization work of KOMZET. For the first few years the government encouraged Jewish settlements, particularly in Ukraine. Support for the project dwindled throughout the next decade. In 1938 OZET was disbanded, following years of declining activity. The Soviets set up three Jewish national raions in Ukraine as well as two in the Crimea – national raions occupied the 3rd level of the Soviet system, but were all disbanded by the end of World War II.

The cities with the largest populations of Jews in 1926 were Odessa, 154,000 or 36.5% of the total population; Kyiv, 140,500 or 27.3%; Kharkiv, 81,500 or 19.5%; and Dnipropetrovsk, 62,000 or 26.7%. In 1931 Lviv's Jewish population numbered 98,000 or 31.9%, and in Chernivtsi, 42,600 or 37.9%.

On 8 April 1929 the new Law on Religious Associations codified all previous religious legislation. All meetings of religious associations were required to have their agenda approved in advance; lists of members of religious associations had to be provided to the authorities. In 1930 the Yevsektsia was dissolved, leaving no central Soviet-Jewish organization. Although the body had served to undermine Jewish religious life, its dissolution led to the disintegration of Jewish secular life as well; Jewish cultural and educational organizations gradually disappeared.</ref> When the Soviet government reintroduced the use of internal passports in 1933, "Jewish" was considered an ethnicity for those purposes.

The Soviet famine of 1932–1933 affected the Jewish population, and led to a migration from shtetls to overcrowded cities.

As the Soviet government annexed territory from Poland, Romania (both would be incorporated into the Ukrainian SSR after World War II) and the Baltic states, roughly two million Jews became Soviet citizens. Restrictions on Jews that had existed in those countries were lifted. At the same time, Jewish organizations in the transferred territories were shut down and their leaders were arrested and exiled. Approximately 250,000 Jews escaped or were evacuated from the annexed territories to the Soviet interior prior to the Nazi invasion.

Jewish settlement in Crimea

In 1921, Crimea became an autonomous republic. In 1923, the All-Union Central Committee passed a motion to resettle a large number of the Jewish population from Ukrainian and Belarusian cities to Crimea, numbering 570,400 families. The plan to further resettle Jewish families was confirmed by the Central Committee of the USSR on 15 July 1926, assigning 124 million roubles to the task and also receiving 67 million from foreign sources.

The Soviet initiative of Jewish settlement in Crimea was opposed by Symon Petliura, who regarded it as a provocation. This train of thought was supported by Arnold Margolin who stated that it would be dangerous to set up Jewish colonies there.

The Soviets twice sought to establish Jewish autonomy in Crimea; once, in the 1920s, with the support of the American Jewish Joint Distribution Committee, and again in 1944, by the Jewish Anti-Fascist Committee.

World War II

The total number of civilians who died during the war and the German occupation of Ukraine is estimated to be as high as seven million. This estimate includes over one million Jews who were shot and killed by the Einsatzgruppen and local Ukrainian collaborators.

The total number of Jews killed in the Holocaust in Eastern Ukraine, or the Ukrainian SSR (within its 1938 borders), is estimated to be slightly less than 700,000 out of a total pre-Holocaust Jewish population of slightly over 1.5 million. Within the borders of Modern Ukraine, the death toll is estimated to be around 900,000.

Post-war situation
Ukraine had 840,000 Jews in 1959, a decrease of almost 70% from 1941 (within Ukraine's current borders). Ukraine's Jewish population declined significantly during the Cold War. In 1989, Ukraine's Jewish population was only slightly more than half of what it had been in 1959. 

Such immigrants included artists, such as Marina Maximilian Blumin and street artist Klone, as well as activists including Gennady Riger and Lia Shemtov.

Independent Ukraine
In 1989, a Soviet census counted 487,000 Jews living in Ukraine. Although discrimination by the state all but halted after Ukrainian independence in 1991, Jews were still discriminated against during the 1990s. For instance, Jews were not allowed to attend some educational institutions. Antisemitism has since declined.

The overwhelming majority of the Jews who remained in Ukraine in 1989 then moved to other countries in the 1990s during and after the collapse of Communism. By 1999 there were various Ukrainian Jewish organizations that disputed each other's legitimacy.

Some 266,300 Ukrainian Jews emigrated to Israel in the 1990s. The 2001 Ukrainian Census counted 106,600 Jews living in Ukraine (the number of Jews also dropped due to a negative birthrate). According to the Public Diplomacy and Diaspora Affairs Minister of Israel, early 2012 there were 250,000 Jews in Ukraine, half of them living in Kyiv. According to the European Jewish Congress, as of 2014, 360,000–400,000 Jews remained.

In November 2007, an estimated 700 Torah scrolls confiscated from Jewish communities during the Soviet era were returned to Jewish communes by state authorities.

The Ukrainian Jewish Committee was established in 2008 in Kyiv to concentrate the efforts of Jewish leaders in Ukraine on resolving the community's strategic problems and addressing socially significant issues. The Committee declared its intention to become one of the world's most influential organizations protecting the rights of Jews and "the most important and powerful structure protecting human rights in Ukraine".

In the 2012 Ukrainian parliamentary elections, All-Ukrainian Union "Svoboda" won its first seats in the Ukrainian Parliament, garnering 10.44% of the popular vote and the fourth most seats among national political parties; This led to concern among Jewish organizations that accused "Svoboda" of Nazi sympathies and antisemitism. In May 2013, the World Jewish Congress listed the party as neo-Nazi. "Svoboda" has denied the charges.

Antisemitic graffiti and violence against Jews are still a problem.

Since the Euromaidan protests, unrest has gripped southern and eastern Ukraine, and this escalated in April 2014 into the War in Donbas and the 2022 Russian invasion of Ukraine

In April 2014, leaflets were distributed by three masked man as people left a synagogue in Donetsk ordering Jews to register to avoid losing their property and citizenship "given that the leaders of the Jewish community of Ukraine support the Banderite junta in Kyiv and are hostile to the Orthodox Donetsk Republic and its citizens". While many speak of a hoax (concerning the authorship of the tracts) which appeared in international media, the fact that these flyers were distributed remains undisputed.

Due to the Euromaidan, Ukrainian Jews making aliyah from Ukraine grew 142% during the first four months of 2014 compared to the previous year. 800 people arrived in Israel over January–April, and over 200 signed up for May 2014. On the other hand, chief rabbi and Chabad emissary of Kyiv Rabbi Jonathan Markovitch claimed in late April 2014 "Today, you can come to Kyiv, Dnipro or Odessa and walk through the streets openly dressed as a Jew, with nothing to be afraid of".

In August 2014, the Jewish Telegraphic Agency reported that the International Fellowship of Christians and Jews was organizing chartered flights to allow at least 150 Ukrainian Jews to immigrate to Israel in September. Jewish organizations within Ukraine, as well as the American Jewish Joint Distribution Committee, the Jewish Agency for Israel and the Jewish community of Dnipropetrovsk, arranged temporary homes and shelters for hundreds of Jews who fled the War in Donbas in eastern Ukraine. Hundreds of Jews reportedly fled the cities of Luhansk and Donetsk.

In 2014 Ihor Kolomoyskyi and Volodymyr Groysman were appointed Governor of Dnipropetrovsk Oblast and Speaker of the Parliament respectively. Groysman became Prime Minister of Ukraine in April 2016. Ukraine elected its first Jewish president in the 2019 presidential election where former comedian and actor of the TV series Servant of the People, Volodymyr Zelensky won over incumbent Petro Poroshenko.

2022 Russian invasion

In February 2022 Russia invaded Ukraine. The Israeli Embassy stayed open on the Sabbath to facilitate the evacuation of Jews. A total of 97 Jews chose to travel to Israel. In addition, 140 Jewish orphans fled to Romania and Moldova. 100 Jews fled to Belarus in order to prepare for their eventual move to Israel On 2 March 2022, the Jewish Agency for Israel reported that hundreds of Jewish war refugees sheltering in Poland, Romania and Moldova were scheduled to leave for Israel the following week. Refugee estimates ranged from 10,000 to 15,200 refugees had arrived in Israel.

Jewish communities
As of 2012, Ukraine had the fifth-largest Jewish community in Europe and the twelfth-largest in the world, behind South Africa and ahead of Mexico. The majority live in Kyiv (about half), Dnipro, Kharkiv and Odessa. Rabbis Jonathan Markovitch of Kyiv and Shmuel Kaminetsky of Dnipro are considered to be among the most influential foreigners in the country. Opened in October 2012 in Dnipro, the multifunctional Menorah center is among the world's largest Jewish community centers.

A growing trend among Israelis is to visit Ukraine on a "roots trip" to learn of Jewish life there. Kyiv is usually mentioned, where it is possible to trace the paths of Sholem Aleichem and Golda Meir; Zhytomyr and Korostyshiv, where one can follow the steps of Haim Nahman Bialik; Berdychiv, where one can trace the life of Mendele Mocher Sforim; Rivne, where one can follow the course of Amos Oz; Buchach – the path of S.Y. Agnon; Drohobych – the place of Maurycy Gottlieb and Bruno Schulz.

Notable Ukrainian Jews

See also

 Antisemitism in Europe
 Racism in Europe
 Racism in Lithuania
 Racism in Poland
 Antisemitism in Russia
 Racism in Russia
 Antisemitism in the Soviet Union
 Racism in the Soviet Union
 Antisemitism in Ukraine
 Racism in Ukraine
 Galician Jews
 History of the Jews in Carpathian Ruthenia
 History of the Jews in Europe
 History of the Jews in Kyiv
 History of the Jews in Lithuania
 History of the Jews in Poland
 History of the Jews in Russia
 History of the Jews in the Soviet Union
 Israel–Lithuania relations
 Israel–Poland relations
 Israel–Russia relations
 Soviet Union and the Arab–Israeli conflict 
 Israel–Ukraine relations
 Janowska concentration camp
 Jewish Roots in Ukraine and Moldova
 Jewish Anti-Fascist Committee
 Jewish gauchos
 Jewish–Ukrainian relations in Eastern Galicia
 List of Galician Jews
 List of Polish Jews
 Lithuanian Jews
 Lwów Ghetto
 Lwów Uprising
 The Holocaust in Lithuania
 The Holocaust in Poland
 The Holocaust in Russia
 The Holocaust in the Soviet Union
 The Holocaust in Ukraine
 Three hares
 Wooden synagogue
 Yerusalimka

Notes

References

Further reading
 
 
 
 
 
 
 
 
 
 
 
 Velychenko, Stephen (2021) Ukraine's Revolutions and anti-Jewish Pogroms * (historians.in.ua).

External links

 Chabad-Lubavitch Centers in Ukraine
 Federation of Jewish Communities of the CIS
 Jewish Agricultural Colonies, adjacent towns and villages in Southern Ukraine
 Jewish Agricultural Colonies of South Ukraine and Crimea webpage with names and maps of Jewish settlements
 Jewish Renaissance in Odessa
 Video of Lecture on Jews of 17th-century Ukraine by Dr. Henry Abramson
 Jewish Roots in Ukraine and Moldova at Routes to Roots Foundation
 Routes to Roots Foundation's Archive Database – search includes Ukraine and Moldova
 Routes to Roots Foundation's Image Database – search includes Ukraine and Moldova

 
Ethnic groups in Ukraine
History of religion in Ukraine